Jean Baptiste Pierre Arné (26 February 1891 – 6 May 1917) was a French rower. He competed in the men's eight event at the 1912 Summer Olympics.

References

External links
 

1891 births
1917 deaths
French male rowers
Olympic rowers of France
Rowers at the 1912 Summer Olympics
Sportspeople from Bayonne